Maksim Podholjuzin (born 13 November 1992) is an Estonian professional footballer currently playing for FCI Levadia in Estonian Meistriliiga as a defender.

Club career

Levadia
Podholjuzin made his debut for Levadia in 2009. He won his first Meistriliiga title with Levadia in 2013.

International career
Podholjuzin made his international debut for Estonia on 5 March 2014 against Gibraltar.

References

External links

1992 births
Living people
Footballers from Tallinn
Estonian people of Russian descent
Estonian footballers
Association football defenders
Esiliiga players
Meistriliiga players
FCI Levadia Tallinn players
Estonia youth international footballers
Estonia under-21 international footballers
Estonia international footballers
FCI Levadia U21 players